Missingmyr is a village in the municipality of Råde, Norway. In 2019, its population was 908.

References 

Villages in Østfold